Yukari Nakagome (born 30 October 1965) is a Japanese cyclist. She competed in the women's cross-country mountain biking event at the 2004 Summer Olympics.

References

1965 births
Living people
Japanese female cyclists
Olympic cyclists of Japan
Cyclists at the 2004 Summer Olympics
Place of birth missing (living people)
Asian Games medalists in cycling
Cyclists at the 2002 Asian Games
Cyclists at the 2010 Asian Games
Cyclists at the 2014 Asian Games
Asian Games silver medalists for Japan
Asian Games bronze medalists for Japan
Medalists at the 2002 Asian Games
Medalists at the 2014 Asian Games
20th-century Japanese women
21st-century Japanese women